General Motors introduced the mid-size transverse engine front-wheel drive GM2900 platform in 1988 with the introductions of the Opel Vectra A and the Vauxhall Cavalier Mk.3 for the 1989 model year. The platform was intended to replace both division's J-cars, the Opel Ascona C and the Vauxhall Cavalier Mk.2, although the platform eventually branched out to Holden, Chevrolet's Latin American branch, and even Saab and Saturn. The GM2900 platform was replaced by the Epsilon platform in 2003, although Saab continued to use the lengthened GM2902 platform for its 9-5 model until 2010, when it was switched to the Epsilon 2 platform. The tooling for the first generation Saab 9-5 was sold to BAIC and with help from Saab engineers they will develop new models for production under the Senova brand.

Models
 1993–1996 Chevrolet Vectra A
 1997–2005 Chevrolet Vectra B
 1990–1997 Holden Calibra
 1996–2002 Holden Vectra
 1990–1997 Opel Calibra
 1988–1995 Opel Vectra A
 1995–2002 Opel Vectra B
 1994–1998 Saab NG900
 1998–2002 Saab 9-3
 1997–2009 Saab 9-5
 2000–2005 Saturn L-Series
 1990–1997 Vauxhall Calibra
 1988–1995 Vauxhall Cavalier Mk.3
 1995–2002 Vauxhall Vectra
 2012-2016 Senova D70

References 

GM2900